The fourth and final season of the animated show Metalocalypse originally aired on Adult Swim from April 29 to July 15, 2012 with 12 episodes. The show follows virtual death metal band Dethklok. This season returned to the original 11-minute-long episode format (15 minutes with commercials). Several songs from this season were included in the album Dethalbum III, which was also released in 2012. The season four DVD/Blu-ray was released on October 30, 2012 through Adult Swim/Warner Home Video.

In May 2015, this season became available on Hulu Plus.

Guests
This season featured several new guest stars, including Drew Pinsky, Amber Tamblyn, Werner Herzog, Byron Minns, Christopher McCulloch, Samantha Eggar, Pat Healy, Ben Shepherd and Kim Thayil of Soundgarden, Cam Pipes of 3 Inches of Blood, Jon Hamm, Janeane Garofalo, Patton Oswalt, Marc Maron, Dweezil Zappa, Asesino, James Urbaniak, Chris Elliott, and Billy Gibbons of ZZ Top, as well as returning guest stars, like Laraine Newman, George "Corpsegrinder" Fisher of Cannibal Corpse, Frankie Ingrassia, and Andy Richter.

Special features

Disc one
Nathan reads Shakespeare #4: A Comedy of Errors

Disc two/Blu-ray disc
Pickles Flyby
StaresDowns #1-3
MurderThoughts
The Prophecy
Dr. Rockzo's greatest hits
CFO Raps
Dethklok Fan Art
The DethGame

Episodes

See also

 List of Adult Swim home videos

References

2012 American television seasons
Metalocalypse seasons